Daniel Modupe Josephus Jonah (born 12 April 1966) is a Sierra Leonean former middle-distance runner. He competed in the men's 1500 metres at the 1988 Summer Olympics.

References

External links
 

1966 births
Living people
Sierra Leone Creole people
Athletes (track and field) at the 1988 Summer Olympics
Sierra Leonean male middle-distance runners
Olympic athletes of Sierra Leone
Place of birth missing (living people)